Imprelis is a selective herbicide created by DuPont. The active ingredient is aminocyclopyrachlor, a synthetic auxin.

Description 
Imprelis is a selective herbicide created by DuPont. The active ingredient is aminocyclopyrachlor, a synthetic auxin.

Imprelis was registered with the United States Environmental Protection Agency for sale in October 2010.  Sale of Imprelis was voluntarily suspended a week before the EPA required sales stopped. DuPont acknowledged it was killing or damaging evergreen trees, including white pine and Norway spruce. DuPont allegedly knew Imprelis would damage evergreens before seeking EPA approval.

DuPont offered to compensate customers whose trees were affected. They asked that a claim be submitted, and said that they would send a claim resolution agreement, which would specify the amount DuPont would pay to settle the claim. By late May 2012, the end of the planting season, many tree owners had not heard from DuPont. Other tree owners who accepted payment agreements with DuPont had not been paid.

Several hundred tree owners have filed lawsuits with DuPont. , they are seeking class action status.

References

External links 
 DuPont Imprelis site
 Environmental Protection Agency Imprelis site

Herbicides
Toxicology
Soil contamination
Lawn care